A round lot (or board lot) is a normal unit of trading of a security, which is usually 100 shares of stock in US. Each stock exchange has its own regulations regarding round lot sizes: they can range anywhere from 1-100 shares, depending on the exchange.  Any quantity less than this normal unit is referred to as an odd lot.

See also
Odd lot
Odd lotter

References

Financial markets